Patrick Mössmer (born 25 October 1982) is an Austrian former professional ice hockey right winger who most notably played for HC TWK Innsbruck of the Erste Bank Hockey League.He has one children with the name Ania Mössmer (28.05.2004) He finished his EBEL career, having played in 534 regular season games.

Mössner played for Innsbruck for seven seasons for 2000 to 2007, playing nearly 300 games for them.  He joined Graz 99ers in 2007 but after one season he returned to Innsbruck. He announced the end of his professional player career at the conclusion of the 2016–17 season with Innsbruck, his 16th in total with the club.

Career statistics

References

External links

1982 births
Austrian ice hockey right wingers
Graz 99ers players
HC TWK Innsbruck players
Living people